The Bacho Kiro cave is situated  west of the town Dryanovo, Bulgaria, only  away from the Dryanovo Monastery. It is embedded in the canyons of the Andaka and Dryanovo River. It was opened in 1890 and the first recreational visitors entered the cave in 1938, two years before it was renamed in honor of Bulgarian National Revival leader, teacher and revolutionary Bacho Kiro. An underground river has over time carved out the many galleries that contain countless stalactone, stalactite, and stalagmite speleothem formations of great beauty. The formations succession: Bacho Kiro’s Throne, The Dwarfs, The Sleeping Princess, The Throne Hall, The Reception Hall, The Haidouti Meeting-Ground, The Fountain and the Sacrificial Altar.

Human remains

The site has yielded the oldest human remains ever to be found in Bulgaria. At one of the earliest known Aurignacian burials (layer 11), two pierced animal teeth were found and ordered into the distinct Bachokiran artifact assemblage. Radiocarbon dated to over 43,000 years ago, they currently represent the oldest known ornaments in Europe. With an approximate age of 46,000 years, human fossils consist of a pair of fragmented mandibles including at least one molar. Whether these early humans were in fact Homo sapiens or Neanderthals was disputed until morphological analysis of a tooth and mitochondrial DNA of bone fragments established that remains were those of Homo sapiens. In samples F6-620 and AA7-738 identified mitochondrial haplogroup M, in samples WW7-240 and CC7-335 determined the mitochondrial haplogroup N, in sample CC7-2289 identified mitochondrial haplogroup R, in sample of BK-1653 identified mitochondrial haplogroup U8.

Three Initial Upper Palaeolithic individuals (c. 44,000 to 40,000 years ago) from Bacho Kiro cave were each found to have relatively high levels of Neanderthal ancestry, with their genomes suggesting a recent Neanderthal ancestor in all three individuals perhaps six or seven generations back. 

In the single dispersal Out of Africa theory, it is believed that populations related to the Initial Upper Palaeolithic population of Bacho Kiro cave contributed ancestry to later Asian populations, because of genetic similarity and to some early West Europeans such as the c. 35,000 year old individual from the Goyet Caves, Belgium, known as 'GoyetQ116-1'. Populations related to these earlier individuals did not contribute detectable ancestry to later European populations. 

However in the multiple dispersal Out of Africa theory, East Asians are found to have a more distant split time from East African populations (73-88kya) compared to modern Europeans (57-76 kya) which could mean that the Bacho Kiro remains could be from a migration of anatomically modern humans from Asia.

In contrast, later individuals from Bacho Kiro cave, such as the c. 35,000 year old 'BK1653' were more closely related to modern European populations than to East Asians.

See also

 Bohunician
 Dryanovo Monastery

References

Tourist attractions in Gabrovo Province
Landforms of Gabrovo Province
History of Gabrovo Province
Balkan mountains
Archaeological sites in Bulgaria
Prehistoric sites in Bulgaria
Show caves in Bulgaria
Limestone caves